The 170th New York State Legislature, consisting of the New York State Senate and the New York State Assembly, met from January 5, 1955, to March 23, 1956, during the first and second years of W. Averell Harriman's governorship, in Albany.

Background
Under the provisions of the New York Constitution of 1938, re-apportioned in 1953, 58 Senators and 150 assemblymen were elected in single-seat districts for two-year terms. The senatorial districts consisted either of one or more entire counties; or a contiguous area within a single county. The counties which were divided into more than one senatorial district were Kings (nine districts), New York (six),  Queens (five), Bronx (four), Erie (three), Nassau (three), Westchester (three), Monroe (two) and Onondaga (two). The Assembly districts consisted either of a single entire county (except Hamilton Co.), or of contiguous area within one county.

At this time there were two major political parties: the Republican Party and the Democratic Party. The Liberal Party, the American Labor Party, the Socialist Workers Party, and the Socialist Labor Party (running under the name of "Industrial Government Party") also nominated tickets.

Elections
The New York state election, 1954, was held on November 2. Ambassador W. Averell Harriman was elected Governor, and D.A. of Bronx County George B. DeLuca was elected Lieutenant Governor, both Democrats with Liberal endorsement. The elections of the other six statewide elective offices resulted in a Democratic State Comptroller with Liberal endorsement, a Republican Attorney General, a Democratic Chief Judge with Liberal and Republican endorsement, a Democratic Court of Appeals judge with Liberal and Republican endorsement, a Democratic Court of Appeals judge with Liberal endorsement, and a Republican Court of Appeals judge with Democratic endorsement. The approximate party strength at this election, as expressed by the vote for Governor/Lieutenant Governor, was: Republicans 2,550,000; Democrats 2,297,000; Liberals 264,000; American Labor 47,000; Socialist Workers 2,600; and Industrial Government 1,700.

Five of the seven women members of the previous legislature—Assemblywomen Mary A. Gillen (Dem.), of Brooklyn; Janet Hill Gordon (Rep.), a lawyer of Norwich; Frances K. Marlatt (Rep.), a lawyer of Mount Vernon; Genesta M. Strong (Rep.), of Plandome Heights; and Mildred F. Taylor (Rep.), a coal dealer of Lyons—were re-elected. Bessie A. Buchanan (Dem.), a retired musical actress and dancer of Harlem, was also elected to the Assembly.

The New York state election, 1955, was held on November 8. No statewide elective offices were up for election. Three vacancies in the State Senate and three vacancies in the Assembly were filled.

Sessions
The Legislature met for the first regular session (the 178th) at the State Capitol in Albany on January 5, 1955; and adjourned on April 2.

Oswald D. Heck (Rep.) was re-elected Speaker.

Walter J. Mahoney (Rep.) was re-elected Temporary President of the State Senate.

The Legislature met for the second regular session (the 179th) at the State Capitol in Albany on January 4, 1956; and adjourned on March 23.

State Senate

Districts

Senators
The asterisk (*) denotes members of the previous Legislature who continued in office as members of this Legislature. Searles G. Shultz changed from the Assembly to the Senate at the beginning of this Legislature. Assemblyman Frank J. Pino was elected to fill a vacancy in the Senate.

Note: For brevity, the chairmanships omit the words "...the Committee on (the)..."

Employees
 Secretary: William S. King

State Assembly

Assemblymen

Note: For brevity, the chairmanships omit the words "...the Committee on (the)..."

Employees
 Clerk: Ansley B. Borkowski
 Sergeant-at-Arms: Herbert A. Bartholomew (1955)
Raymond J. Roche (1956)
 Deputy Journal Clerk: Maude E. Ten Eyck

Notes

Sources
 Where to Reach Your State Senator Or Assemblyman in Civil Service Leader (January 18, 1955, Vol. XVI, No. 19, pg. 3 and 14)
 Members of the New York Senate (1950s) at Political Graveyard
 Members of the New York Assembly (1950s) at Political Graveyard

170
1955 in New York (state)
1956 in New York (state)
1955 U.S. legislative sessions
1956 U.S. legislative sessions